Georgios Versis (born 1894, date of death unknown) was a Greek fencer. He competed in the individual and team épée events at the 1912 Summer Olympics.

References

1894 births
Year of death missing
Greek male fencers
Olympic fencers of Greece
Fencers at the 1912 Summer Olympics